Y'all Don't Understand is a live album released on October 17, 2000 by the Washington, D.C.-based go-go band Junk Yard Band.

Track listing
	
"Where My Homies" – 4:46
"1-On-1" – 4:17
"Y'all Don't" – 0:50
"Thug Song" – 5:18
"Hee Haw" – 5:23
"Wink and Dogs" – 5:32
"Peach Fuzz" – 2:27
"Go-Hard" – 7:58
"Congo Break" – 8:20
"Ruff it Off" – 9:29
"Tiddy Ball" – 6:19
"You Can Hate Me" – 4:23

References

External links
Y'all Don't Understand at AllMusic

2000 live albums
Junk Yard Band albums